Cryptalaus is a genus of click beetles belonging to the family Elateridae.

Species

References

Elateridae
Elateridae genera